Kukenthalia is a genus of ascidian tunicates in the family Styelidae.

The only species in the genus Kukenthalia is Kukenthalia borealis (Gottschaldt, 1894).

References

Stolidobranchia
Tunicate genera
Monotypic tunicate genera